Louth may refer to:

Australia
Hundred of Louth, a cadastral unit in South Australia
 Louth, New South Wales, a town
Louth Bay, a bay in South Australia
Louth Bay, South Australia, a town and locality

Canada
 Louth, Ontario

Ireland
 County Louth, Ireland
 Louth GAA, a Gaelic games association
 Louth county football team
Louth, County Louth, a village in the heart of the county Louth
County Louth Historic Names, Listing of historically documented names for Louth, village & county
Louth (Parliament of Ireland constituency) (1692–1801)
County Louth (UK Parliament constituency) (1801–1885, 1918–1922), Ireland
North Louth (UK Parliament constituency) (1885–1918)
South Louth (UK Parliament constituency) (1885–1918)
 Louth (Dáil constituency), Ireland

United Kingdom
 Louth, Lincolnshire, England
 Louth, Lincolnshire (UK Parliament constituency) (1885–1983), in England

Other
 Louth (crater), a crater on Mars